Philippe Béha (born 1950) is a french canadian children's book writer and illustrator living in Quebec.

He worked as a freelance visual designer for Radio-Canada before becoming a full-time illustrator. Béha has illustrated more than 180 children's books. In 1982, he was awarded the Prix Communication-Jeunesse for best illustration in the professional illustrator category. He was a finalist for the Prix du livre jeunesse des Bibliothèques de Montréal in 2009, 2010 and 2012.

Selected works 
 Le Voyage à la recherche du temps (1982) text by Lucie Ledoux, received the 
 Pipi dans le pot; Mes cheveux; J’aime Claire; Dors, petit ours (1983), text by Sylvie Assathiany and Louise Pelletier, received the Prix Alvine-Bélisle
 Grand-maman; Mon bébé-sœur; Où est ma tétine ?; Quand ça va mal (1983), text by Sylvie Assathiany and Louise Pelletier, received the Canada Council Children's Literature Prize for illustration
 Les Jeux de Pic-Mots (1988), received the Canada Council Children's Literature Prize for illustration
 Mais que font les fées avec toutes ces dents ? (1989), text by Michel Luppens, received a Mr. Christie's Book Award
 J'aime les poèmes )2003), text by Henriette Major, received the Prix illustrations jeunesse GLV
 Pas si bête (2005), received the

References 

1950 births
Living people
Canadian children's book illustrators
Canadian children's writers in French
Writers from Montreal